Mark Simmons (born ) is an English comedian, known for his one-liners, who won the UK's Comics Comic Award in 2022.

Career 
Before working as a comedian, Simmons worked in a gym. He started his comedy career in 2008 supporting Sean Walsh. Simmons is known for his one-liners.

Simmons has appeared on UK panel show Mock the Week and produces the Jokes with Mark Simmons podcast. One of his jokes was voted the second funniest at the Edinburgh Fridge in 2022. At the festival he was compared to Tim Vine and Gary Delaney and was praised for his audience engagement. Time Out compared his performance to Milton Jones and Noel Fielding.

As of 2022, he has 165,000 followers on TikTok. He won the Comics Comic Award in 2022.

Personal life 
Simmons is from Canterbury and was aged 37 in 2017.

References

External links 
 Mark Simmons - TikTok

Year of birth missing (living people)
Living people
British comedians
People from Canterbury